

399001–399100 

|-bgcolor=#f2f2f2
| colspan=4 align=center | 
|}

399101–399200 

|-bgcolor=#f2f2f2
| colspan=4 align=center | 
|}

399201–399300 

|-bgcolor=#f2f2f2
| colspan=4 align=center | 
|}

399301–399400 

|-bgcolor=#f2f2f2
| colspan=4 align=center | 
|}

399401–399500 

|-bgcolor=#f2f2f2
| colspan=4 align=center | 
|}

399501–399600 

|-id=565
| 399565 Dévényanna ||  || Anna Dévény (1935–2017) was a Hungarian physiotherapist and gymnastics trainer. She developed a unique treatment system, which helps to restore the muscle function, and abnormal body positions of babies. The method has helped thousands of children recover in recent decades. || 
|}

399601–399700 

|-id=673
| 399673 Kadenyuk ||  || Leonid Kadeniuk (1951–2018) was a Ukrainian astronaut. He made his only spaceflight as Payload Specialist on NASA's STS-87 Columbia mission in 1997. || 
|}

399701–399800 

|-id=745
| 399745 Ouchaou ||  || Omar Ouchaou (born 1968), the caretaker of the Oukaïmeden Observatory , in Oukaïmeden of Morocco's Atlas Mountains || 
|}

399801–399900 

|-bgcolor=#f2f2f2
| colspan=4 align=center | 
|}

399901–400000 

|-id=979
| 399979 Lewseaman ||  || Lewis T. Seaman (born 1923), an engineer for many years at GE Aerospace. || 
|}

References 

399001-400000